Jurka Vas is a village on the right bank of the Krka River in the Municipality of Straža in southeastern Slovenia. The area is part of the historical region of Lower Carniola. The municipality is now included in the Southeast Slovenia Statistical Region.

References

External links
Jurka Vas at Geopedia

Populated places in the Municipality of Straža